Zu Zu and Zuzu may refer to:

Zu Zu, Tennessee
Zu Zu Ginger Snaps
Zuzu, an area in Tanzania
Zuzu Angel, Brazilian fashion designer
Zuzu Angel (film), a 2006 movie based on the life of Zuzu Angel
Zuzu Bailey, a character in the film It's a Wonderful Life
Zuzu Bollin, a Texan blues guitarist
Zūzū-ben, an informal name in Japanese for the Tōhoku dialect of the Japanese language
Zuzu & the Supernuffs, a KidsCo animated children's TV series
Lóránt Méhes Zuzu, Hungarian artist
Nick and Zuzu, a syndicated comic strip by Nick Galifianakis
Say Zuzu, a US roots rock band